, also being the Italian title for Rebel Without a Cause) is a song by Italian singer Mahmood. It was released on 7 December 2018 by Island Records, as the fourth single from his debut studio album,  (2019). The song was written by Alessandro Mahmoud and Stefano Ceri. The song peaked at number 40 on the Italian Singles Chart.

Music video
A music video to accompany the release of "" was first released onto YouTube on 13 December 2018 at a total length of three minutes and seventeen seconds.

Charts

Certifications

Release history

References

2018 singles
2018 songs
Island Records singles
Mahmood (singer) songs
Songs written by Mahmood